HNLMS Willem van Ewijck was a  of the Royal Netherlands Navy.

Service history
Willem van Ewijck was sunk on 8 September 1939 after hitting a mine off Terschelling. Thirty-three of the crew were killed.

References

Jan van Amstel-class minesweepers
Ships built in Rotterdam
1937 ships
World War II minesweepers of the Netherlands
World War II shipwrecks in the North Sea
Maritime incidents in September 1939
Ships sunk by mines